Defending champion Steffi Graf defeated Arantxa Sánchez Vicario in a rematch of the previous year's final, 6–3, 7–5 to win the ladies' singles tennis title at the 1996 Wimbledon Championships. It was her seventh Wimbledon singles title and 20th major singles title overall. It was also the second consecutive major final between the two women, with Graf winning the French Open crown over Sánchez Vicario a month earlier.

Kimiko Date reached the semifinals, the last time a Japanese woman would do so at a major until Naomi Osaka in 2018.

Seeds

  Steffi Graf (champion)
  Monica Seles (second round)
  Conchita Martínez (fourth round)
  Arantxa Sánchez Vicario (final)
  Anke Huber (third round)
  Jana Novotná (quarterfinals)
  Chanda Rubin (withdrew)
  Lindsay Davenport (second round)
  Mary Joe Fernández (quarterfinals)
  Magdalena Maleeva (second round)
  Brenda Schultz-McCarthy (third round)
  Kimiko Date (semifinals)
  Mary Pierce (quarterfinals)
  Amanda Coetzer (second round)
  Irina Spîrlea (second round)
  Martina Hingis (fourth round)
  Karina Habšudová (first round)

Chanda Rubin withdrew due to injury. She was replaced in the draw by the highest-ranked non-seeded player Karina Habšudová, who became the #17 seed.

Qualifying

Draw

Finals

Top half

Section 1

Section 2

Section 3

Section 4

Bottom half

Section 5

Section 6

Section 7

Section 8

References

External links

1996 Wimbledon Championships on WTAtennis.com
1996 Wimbledon Championships – Women's draws and results at the International Tennis Federation

Women's Singles
Wimbledon Championship by year – Women's singles
Wimbledon Championships
Wimbledon Championships